Tom Nicholas is a British economist currently the William J. Abernathy Professor of Business Administration at Harvard Business School.

References

Year of birth missing (living people)
Living people
Harvard Business School faculty
American economists
Place of birth missing (living people)